Haralds Hāns (born 8 January 1893, date of death unknown) was a Latvian sprinter. He competed in the men's 200 metres at the 1912 Summer Olympics representing the Russian Empire.

References

1893 births
Year of death missing
Athletes (track and field) at the 1912 Summer Olympics
Latvian male sprinters
Olympic competitors for the Russian Empire
Place of birth missing